Kaushik Ganguly (born 4 August 1968)  is an Indian film director, screenwriter and actor in Bengali cinema. Multiple National Award winner Actor-Director, Kaushik Ganguly is known for making films that explore various aspects sexuality, like Ushnatar Janye (2003), which deals with a lesbian relationship, and Arekti Premer Golpo (2010), which examines transgender identity & Nagarkirtan (2017), an LGBTQ Movie.

Life 
Ganguly was born in Kolkata on 4 August 1968. His father was guitarist Sunil Ganguly. He attended Ramakrishna Mission Vidyalaya, Narendrapur and later Jadavpur University where he worked on a degree in Bengali literature. While at university, he started a theatre troupe with his future wife actress Churni Ganguly and Suman Mukhopadhyay (who would later become a film director). In 1987, Ganguly began working as a screenwriter for Tollywood films. In 1995, he moved to ETV Bangla to direct telefilms like Ushnatar Janye, Ulka and Aatithi. These telefilms incorporated elements like lesbianism and sex determination that had not been depicted in Bengali television productions before.

Career 
Kaushik made his directorial debut with Sex Education (2004). After his debut, over the years, he has directed more than 15 films and along the way has won several awards. Few of his most notable films include Laptop, which won the National Award for Best Background Music in 2011, Shabdo (2012), which won the National Award for Best Bengali Film and Chotoder Chobi (2015). His 2017 directorial venture includes Chaya O Chobi, a Bengali drama starring Abir Chatterjee, Koel Mallick and Ritwick Chakraborty, Nagarkirtan, an LGBTQ movie starring Riddhi Sen and Ritwick Chakraborty.

Filmography

Director

Notable acting roles

Television 
 Hariharan
 Ulka
 Aatithi
 Shesh Kritya
 Collage
 Chhayachhobi
 Chhadmabeshi (Starring Rudranil Ghosh, Jisshu Sengupta, Srabanti Chatterjee)
 Diagnosis
 De-Ray
 2003: Ghare O Bairey
 2003: Ushnatar Janye
 2010: Bandhobi
 2010: Bagh Nokh

Screenwriter 
 2005: Shunyo E Bukey
 2009: Jackpot
 2010: Arekti Premer Golpo
 2011: Rang Milanti
 2012: Laptop

Awards 
Kaushik Ganguly received multiple awards for his role in various films.
2012: 60th National Film Awards for Best Feature Film in Bengali: Shabdo
2013: IFFI Best Director Award for the film "Apur Panchali" at the 44th International Film Festival of India
2014: Nominated for Best Director for Shabdo in Filmfare Awards East
2014: Winner for Best Film Critic's Choice for Shabdoin Filmfare Awards East
2014: Nominated for Best Supporting Actor for Kangal Malsat in Filmfare Awards East
2015: National Film Award for Best Film on Other Social Issues for Chotoder Chobi
2015: IFFI ICFT UNESCO Gandhi Medal Cinemawala at 46th International Film Festival of India
2017: 64th National Film Awards for Best Feature Film in Bengali: Bishorjan
2018: National Film Award - Special Jury Award (feature film) for Nagarkirtan
2021:67th National Film Awards for Best Original Screenplay for the film Jyeshthoputro
2021: 4th Filmfare Awards Bangla for Best Director for Jyeshthoputro

References

External links 
 

Bengali film directors
Male actors in Bengali cinema
Indian male screenwriters
Living people
1968 births
Kalakar Awards winners
Film directors from Kolkata
21st-century Indian film directors
Male actors from Kolkata
Directors who won the Best Film on Other Social Issues National Film Award
Ramakrishna Mission schools alumni
Jadavpur University alumni